Dr. Hudson's Secret Journal is an American medical drama which aired in syndication from 1955 to 1957. It was based on a 1939 book of the same name by Lloyd C. Douglas, that was a prequel to his 1929 novel Magnificent Obsession. A total of 78 episodes were produced.

In 1955 a nationwide competition was held in TV Guide to find a young actor to play Dr. Hudson's protégé, Tim Watson, for several episodes. those entering had to submit a photo and recording in which they read emotional dialogue. The winner was a young actor named Joe Walker.

Cast

John Howard as Dr. Wayne Hudson
Cheryl Callaway as Kathy Hudson
Olive Blakeney as Mrs. Grady
Frances Mercer as Nurse Ann Talbot
Jack Kelly as Dr. Bennett

References

External links
 
 
John Howard interview https://news.google.com/newspapers?nid=888&dat=19570215&id=JyVSAAAAIBAJ&sjid=A3YDAAAAIBAJ&pg=3469,6805765

1955 American television series debuts
1957 American television series endings
1950s American drama television series
1950s American medical television series
Black-and-white American television shows
English-language television shows
First-run syndicated television programs in the United States
Television shows based on American novels